Pristimantis gretathunbergae, also known as Greta Thunberg's rainfrog, is a species of frog in the family Strabomantidae, native to Panama. It is named in honor of climate activist Greta Thunberg. It lives in small pools of water held in bromeliads growing on the cloud forests of Mount Chucantí and other mountains of the Darién Gap, and of central Panama.

The type specimen was discovered by an international team of biologists led by Abel Batista, from Panama, and Konrad Mebert from Switzerland in Cerro Chucantí, a private reserve located in the province of Darién.

References

gretathunbergae
Species named after Greta Thunberg
Endemic fauna of Panama
Amphibians described in 2022